Yeh Dil Mera is a 2019 Pakistani romantic thriller television series that premiered on Hum TV on 30 October 2019. It is produced by Momina Duraid under her banner MD Productions. The serial stars Sajal Aly and Ahad Raza Mir, and Adnan Siddiqui.

The drama serial was quite popular for its thrilling and interesting storyline.

Plot 
Aina (Sajal Aly) is the only daughter of a powerful business tycoon, Mir Farooq Zaman (Adnan Siddiqui). She is a chemical engineering student, and intends to complete her internship from AK oil industry, named after its CEO Aman-Ullah Khan (Ahad Raza Mir)

After various interactions, Aman through his charming personality wins over Aina’s heart and proposes her for marriage. Aman cancels the marriage, a few days before the function and flies to UK, only to later come back and marry her, after she begs for it.

Aina’s life takes a downturn after marriage, as Aman becomes hostile towards her. She starts to look for answers and ends finding up about Aman’s traumatic childhood, in which his parents and sister were murdered by her father. Their relationship is all but over after Aman blames Mir Farooq to be the murderer.

They both travel to Daryabagh, where Aman’s parents were allegedly murdered. Though together, they both now have different objectives, for Aina, to prove her father’s innocence, whereas for Aman to avenge the death of his parents and sister.

Cast 
 Sajal Aly as Noor-ul-Ain Zaman
 Ahad Raza Mir as Amaanullah Khan
 Adnan Siddiqui as Mir Farooq Zaman
 Paras Masroor as Ali Bakhsh
 Zarnish Khan as Humaira
 Mira Sethi as Neelofer Farooq
 Farhan Ali Agha as Ghauri
 Mariam Mirza as Mrs. Ghauri
 Rabia Butt as Sahira
 Natasha Hussain as Farhana
Adnan Tariq Qureshi as Ubaidullah
Yahya Ahmad as Ibrahim
Naima Khan as Nargis Bua 
Syed Mohammad Ahmed as Dr.Arsalan
Musa as Maani/Amanullah (young)

Music 

 
Shiraz Uppal sung and composed the song Yeh dil mera while the lyrics were written by Shakeel Sohail.The other soundtrack Tip Tip was sung by Sajal Aly, who plays protagonist in the serial and Naveed Nashad and was composed by Nashad also. The lyrics of the Tip Tip were written by Aehsun Talish.

Production 
The show was earlier titled Mujhay Vida Kar but later changed.

The writer, Farhat Ishtiaq said that Yeh Dil Mera was supposed to be a novel; 300 pages in she faced a writer’s block so she left it incomplete. In 2017, she intended to finish the novel alongside the drama adaptation but scared of the comparison, she decided to leave the novel for later.

The production location of the serial Darya Baagh is a fictional place, the shooting was actually done in Shogran, situated between Kaghan valley and Neelum Valley.

Reception

Critical reception
The serial received positive reviews for its haunting theme and performances of the lead couple. A reviewer from Daily Times lauded the story of the serial stating, "It wasn’t only mysterious but also a show that heavily focuses on the theme of Mental Health, a subject that is spoken very briefly about and sometimes also ignored."

Controversy

After the release of teasers of the show, the show was heavily criticised for the publicity of sexual harassment in the work place as a romantic genre, to which Farhat Ishtiaq replied that by watching the teaser of just 30 seconds, the whole story of the show cannot be predicted. Viewers will see that why she (Aina) went for the job interview with such a heavy makeup.  It may be that both characters know each other already.

Accolades

References

External links
 
 Official website

Hum TV original programming
2019 Pakistani television series debuts
2020 Pakistani television series endings
Urdu-language television shows